Black Forest Children is a 1922 German silent film directed by Leo Peukert.

Cast
In alphabetical order

References

Bibliography

External links

1922 films
Films of the Weimar Republic
German silent feature films
German black-and-white films